Viennensis or Gallia Viennensis was a Late Roman province that derived its name from its capital Vienna (modern day Vienne, Isère), a Roman city, first located in Gallia Narbonensis.

Vienna was first given the rank of colonia by Caesar, after his Gallic campaigns in 58 BCE and 52 BCE, as a colony of veterans (Colonia Julia Viennensium); Augustus reinstated the rights after the romanized Allobroges had revolted which led to a temporary loss of the title; Caligula eventually named it Colonia Julia Augusta Florentia Viennensium in 40 CE.

During the reorganization of the provinces under the tetrachy of Diocletian in the early 4th century, Vienna then became the capital of the province of Viennensis with the tribes of the Allobrogi, Segovellauni, Helvii, Tricastini, Vocontii and Cavari.

In the 5th century the province was further divided into Gallia Viennense I, with its capital Vienne, and Gallia Viennense II, with its capital Arles.

References

See also

Septem Provinciae
Lugdunum
Augusta Treverorum

4th-century establishments in the Roman Empire
5th-century disestablishments in the Roman Empire
States and territories established in the 4th century
States and territories disestablished in the 5th century
Late Roman provinces
Gallia Narbonensis